Habibullah Khan (3 June 1872 – 20 February 1919) was the Emir of Afghanistan from 1901 until his death in 1919. He was the eldest son of the Emir Abdur Rahman Khan, whom he succeeded by right of primogeniture in October 1901. His grandfather was Mohammad Afzal Khan.

Early life 
Habibullah was the eldest son of Emir Abdur Rahman, and was born in Samarkand, Uzbekistan in 1871. He had a younger brother, born on December 7, 1874, Nasrullah Khan.

Reign 

Habibullah was a relatively reform-minded ruler who attempted to modernize his country. During his reign he worked to bring modern medicine and other technology to Afghanistan. Many people who were forced into exile by his father were returned to Afghanistan by a general amnesty decreed by Habibullah. In 1903, Habibullah founded the Habibia school as well as a military academy. He also worked to put in place progressive reforms in his country. He instituted various legal reforms and repealed many of the harshest criminal penalties. One of his chief advisers, Abdul Lateef was sentenced to death in 1903 for apostasy, being stoned to death in Kabul. Other reforms included the dismantling of the internal intelligence organization that had been put in place by his father. Qala-e-Seraj in Mihtarlam was built by the Amir c. 1912–13 to spend his winters.

Khost rebellion 

In May 1912, Habibullah faced the only crisis in his career when a rebellion erupted in Khost led by Jehandad Khan, a rival claimant to the Afghan throne, known as the Khost rebellion. This rebellion ended in August that same year, when the rebels were given concessions by the Afghan government.

World War I 
Habibullah maintained the country's neutrality in World War I, despite strenuous efforts by the Sultan of the Ottoman Empire and a German military mission (Niedermayer–Hentig Expedition) to enlist Afghanistan on its side. He also greatly reduced tensions with British India, signing a treaty of friendship in 1905 and paying an official state visit in 1907. While in India, he was initiated into Freemasonry, at Lodge Concordia, No. 3102.

Death 
Habibullah was assassinated by a military officer whilst hunting at Kalagosh, Laghman Province on 20 February 1919. Habibullah's brother Nasrullah Khan briefly succeeded him as Emir and held power for a week between 21 and 28 February 1919 before being ousted and imprisoned by Amanullah Khan, Habibullah's third son. This occurred a few months before the Third Anglo-Afghan War.

Honours
Knight Grand Cross of the Order of St Michael and St George (GCMG) – 1896
Knight Grand Cross of the Order of the Bath (GCB) – 1907

References

Bibliography

External links

 
 Ancestry.com: Afghan royalty

1872 births
1919 deaths
1919 murders in Afghanistan
20th-century Afghan monarchs
20th-century murdered monarchs
20th-century Afghan politicians
Emirs of Afghanistan
Barakzai dynasty
Pashtun people
Afghan secularists
Assassinated Afghan politicians
Deaths by firearm in Afghanistan
People murdered in Afghanistan
People from Samarkand
Honorary Knights Grand Cross of the Order of the Bath
Honorary Knights Grand Cross of the Order of St Michael and St George
1900s in Afghanistan
1910s in Afghanistan